Fallen Leaf may refer to:
Fallen Leaf, California, unincorporated community
Fallen Leaf Lake (Washington), lake
Fallen Leaf Lake (California), lake